Stomphastis mixograpta is a moth of the family Gracillariidae. It is known from South Africa.

References

Endemic moths of South Africa
Stomphastis
Moths of Africa